The 1914 VMI Keydets football team represented the Virginia Military Institute in their 24th season of organized football. Under head coach Frank Gorton, the Keydets held a 4–4 record.

Schedule

References

VMI
VMI Keydets football seasons
VMI Keydets football